The Fair Trading Act 1973 is an Act of the Parliament of the United Kingdom.

References

United Kingdom Acts of Parliament 1973